Michael Cleary may refer to:
Michael Cleary (rugby) (born 1940), Australian politician and dual-code rugby player
Michael Cleary (politician), Fianna Fáil TD 1927–1945
Michael J. Cleary (1925–2020), Irish Roman Catholic bishop
Michael Cleary (hurler) (born 1966), former Irish hurler for Nenagh Éire Óg and Tipperary
Michael Cleary (priest) (1934–1993), Irish Roman Catholic priest
Mike Cleary (1858–1893), Irish-American boxer
Michael Cleary, Irish criminal who killed his wife Bridget Cleary in 1895
M. J. Cleary (1877–1947), American politician

See also
Cleary (surname)